Missouri Key is a small island in the lower Florida Keys.

U.S. 1 (or the Overseas Highway) crosses the key at approximately mile marker 39.5, between Ohio Key and Little Duck Key.

The island was named during Henry Flagler's Overseas Railroad construction years by workers from that state.

It is sometimes known locally as Little Grassy Key or Grassy Island.

References

Uninhabited islands of Monroe County, Florida
Islands of the Florida Keys
Islands of Florida